Zeichi-Ceide syndrome is a rare disease discovered in 2007. It is named after its discoverer, R.M. Zeichi-Ceide, who observed three siblings born of consanguineous parents with distinctive characteristics, including facial anomalies, large feet, mental deficiency, and occipital atretic cephalocele. The investigators suspected the symptoms were caused by autosomal recessive inheritance.

As a rare disease, Zeichi-Ceide syndrome is registered in the Online Mendelian Inheritance in Man and the U.S. National Institutes of Health's Genetic and Rare Diseases databases.

References 

Rare diseases
Syndromes